The Unicorns N' Rainbows Tour  was a concert tour by American rap rock band Limp Bizkit.

It took place mostly in Europe, visiting countries they never visited before, and extended into a short Asian leg as well, as well as one-off special appearance in Las Vegas, Nevada, after a UFC 100 performance was cancelled. Two German dates on the tour, in Hamburg and Dortmund, were supported by rap rock act Hollywood Undead.

The tour marks the reunion of the band's original line-up (Fred Durst, Wes Borland, Sam Rivers, DJ Lethal and John Otto), as well as the release of a new album, the band's first since 2005's The Unquestionable Truth (Part 1). The new album, due to release sometime in 2010, will be followed by an additional promotional tour, this time in North America as well.

Set list

Tour dates

References 

2009 concert tours
Limp Bizkit concert tours
Reunion concert tours